Franco Romano Calaresu (1931 – July 26, 1996) was initially a medical doctor and later became a reputed Canadian scholar and professor of neurophysiology of the Department of Physiology at the University of Western Ontario.  He held an M.D. from the University of Milan, and a Ph.D. from the University of Alberta.  He was elected in 1995 as Fellow of the Royal Society of Canada.   His main area of interest was the nervous system and the integration of its mechanisms.   His group pioneered the use of the mainframe analysis of data collected during surgical experiments on laboratory animals.  He had mostly carried out neural studies on the central and peripheral mechanisms of autonomic reflexes, with special emphasis on the cardiovascular ones. He was also interested in Dante, and belonged to a group of faculty members who met to read and discuss Dante's work.

Publications

Articles

Neural integration of physiological mechanisms and behaviour:   JAF  Stevenson memorial volume (1975 )
Experimental Physiology (1985)

References

External links
PubMed search for FR Calaresu

1931 births
1996 deaths
20th-century Canadian physicians
Canadian medical academics
Academic staff of the University of Western Ontario
Canadian physiologists
Canadian neuroscientists
Fellows of the Royal Society of Canada

University of Milan alumni
University of Alberta alumni
Canadian medical researchers